Oklahoma is the fourteenth studio album by American musician Keb' Mo' and was released on June 14, 2019 by Concord Records label. The album featured guest contributions from Rosanne Cash, Jaci Velasquez, Robert Randolph, Taj Mahal and a duet with Robbie Brooks Moore (his wife). The album also produced two singles: "Put a Woman in Charge" released on September 28, 2018, and "Don't Throw it Away" released on June 12, 2019.

Background
The lead single of the album was "Put a Woman in Charge" featuring Rosanne Cash and was released on September 28, 2018. On October 11, 2018 a music video was released for the song. The second single, "Don't Throw it Away" featuring Taj Mahal was released on June 12, 2019. He collaborated with the Plastic Pollution Coalition to release a music video to the song. On June 14, 2019 Mo released the song "Oklahoma" as a promotional single, as well as a lyric video to accompany it.

Reception
"I Remember You" peaked at #7 on the Blues Digital songs chart, and #19 on the year-end chart.

Oklahoma won the Grammy Award for Best Americana Album at the 62nd Grammy Awards, his first Grammy in the American Roots category and his fifth win overall.

Track listing 
Credits adapted from Keb' Mo's website

Personnel 
Adapted from Tidal
 Keb' Mo' – main vocals, guitar (Dobro, Acoustic, electric, steel, national steel), percussion, shaker,harmonica
 Rosanne Cash – vocals 
 Taj Mahal , Bass, b.v.
 Robert Randolph _ Lap steel guitar 
 Jaci Velasquez
 Robbie Brooks Moore – vocals 

Samuel Alexader - Organ [Hammond]], el. piano [wurlitzer]], keyboards
Cremaine Booker - Cello
Corie Covel, Andy Leftwich - Violin
Markus Finnie - Drums
Jim Hoke - Acordion, wurlitzer
Scotty Huff - Trumpet
DeMarco Jonson - Organ [Hammond]]
Emeli Kohavi - Viola
Eric Ramey - Bass guitar
David Rodgers - Keyboards, wurlitzer
 Jovan Quallo - Saxophone
 Joshua Scalf - Trombone
Keio Stroud - Drums
Chester Thompson - drums

Charts

Year-end charts

References 

2019 albums
Keb' Mo' albums
Grammy Award for Best Americana Album
Concord Records albums